Vaughan Penn is an American singer/songwriter/producer from North Carolina who has had over 150 major television and film placements featuring 55 original songs.  She's known for her unique sound of earthy-pop-rock music that combines meaningful songwriting with a powerfully melodic sound. With strong rhythmic textures and hints of Americana roots in the production, her songs have pure emotional honesty; both musically and lyrically.

 Grey's Anatomy
Private Practice
 Boston Legal
 The Hills
 Laguna Beach: The Real Orange County
Kicking & Screaming
Showtimes Promo For:  Nurse Jackie, L-Word, Californication, Weeds
The Big Short
Private Practice
Forget Me Not
Criminal Minds
Bones
NBCs Superstore
OWNs/The Hero Effect (Rising Tide episode)
Isabelle Dances Into The Spotlight

Vaughan has recorded with, toured and opened for many national acts including:  Emmy Lou Harris, Indigo Girls, Darius Rucker and Huey Lewis to name a few.

Discography
Vaughan has released nine CDs on her indie label Meepers Music Records:
She has also released one CD with Sony/Provident
Barefoot Martini (2022)
Surf City Sessions (2021)
Vaughan & The ChillCats (2020-Vaughan's Debut Jazz CD)
Carolina Island Girl (2019)
Acoustic Detour (2017 Meepers Music Records)
Renew The Power (2015 Meepers Music Records)
Solitary Girl (2011 Meepers Music Records)
One Reason - Chynna & Vaughan (2009 Provident/Sony)
Somebody Besides Yourself (2007 Meepers Music Records)
 Angels Fly (2005 Meepers Music Records)
Transcendence (2003 Meepers Music Records)
Over My Head (2001 Meepers Music Records)

Other works
She was in a Contemporary Christian duo with Chynna Phillips (Wilson Phillips)called Chynna & Vaughan (Provident/Reunion Records).

References

Living people
American singer-songwriters
Year of birth missing (living people)